Roger Bader (born 29 September 1964) is a Swiss retired ice hockey player and coach, who coached the Austrian national team at the 2019 IIHF World Championship.

References

External links

1964 births
Living people
Austria men's national ice hockey team coaches
People from Winterthur
Swiss expatriate ice hockey people
Swiss expatriate sportspeople in Austria
Swiss ice hockey coaches
Swiss ice hockey defencemen
Sportspeople from the canton of Zürich